Portage-du-Fort is a village municipality in the Pontiac Regional County Municipality in the southwest corner of the Outaouais region of Quebec, Canada. The village lies across the Ottawa River from Chenaux, Ontario and Horton, Ontario.

At Portage-du-Fort there is a dam, the Chenaux Hydro-Electric Power Station, and bridge across the Ottawa River.

Toponymy
Portage-du-Fort is named after the portage trail which started here and would lead upstream around a set of falls on the Ottawa River.

However, there are several hypotheses to explain the "Fort" portion. Among the most popular is the assumption that a fort was present here on the shore of the Ottawa River to keep provisions at the portage. It has been claimed that a fort called Dufort was flooded in the rapids at this location. However, some researchers argue that the fort in question has never existed and may be a reference to another fort at the mouth of the Coulonge River (after which modern Fort-Coulonge is named). Moreover, the word formerly did not always convey a military connotation and could be more or less synonymous with a village or hamlet, or even a post or warehouse which was fortified.

One theory suggests that the name goes back to a custom of the Algonquins who would paint their bodies here and it was originally named Portage du Fard (French for "make-up"), which changed into "Fort".

Another possibility is that Fort (French also for "strong") makes reference to the strength needed to haul the heavy canoes and supplies over the arduous portage.

But there is no certainty on any of these theories.

History
In 1611, a French scout named Nicolas de Vignau arrived at this site together with a group of Algonquins while on their way to Allumette Island. From here they had to portage around a series of 5 difficult waterfalls on the Ottawa River. The portage from Harbor Square to Bentley's Landing is one of the oldest trails in North America because the Native peoples inhabiting the valley have used it for thousands of years.

In 1694, Louis d'Ailleboust, Sieur de Coulonge, established a fur trading post near the mouth of the Coulonge River. Subsequently the long portage around the falls that led to Fort Coulonge became known as "le portage du fort". But the site was only periodically inhabited, based on travel periods, especially in spring and early summer.

In the early 19th century timber slides were built around the falls, allowing loggers easy access to Pontiac County and Portage-du-Fort became the hub for all traffic connected with the lumber industry.

The first real settlers came in 1844, the year when the village was surveyed. In 1847, the post office opened and Henry Osborne built a depot with storehouse to supply the lumber industry further inland. On September 19, 1855, Portage-du-Fort became the county seat with Patrick Fox as its first mayor and warden.

A memorial of Lady Head`s visit to the Upper Ottawa, in a bark canoe, in 1856, stands at Portage-du-Fort, Quebec. She was the wife of Sir Edmund Walker Head, 8th Baronet. Portage du Fort was home to the area's first newspaper, the Pontiac Pioneer and Portage du Fort Advertiser, which was published by G.E. White from 1855 to 1865.

From 1860 onward, Portage-du-Fort was an important centre of the Pontiac with its mills, its train station, and its terminus for steam boats carrying grain and wood.

This prosperity led to the creation of the municipality in 1863 when it separated from the municipality of Litchfield Township. That same year Stanislas Drapeau wrote:

However, a serious fire in 1914 almost destroyed the place entirely and curbed its development for many years. Further decline came when the Canadian Northern Railway bypassed the village.

In 1950, the Chenaux hydroelectric power plant and dam were built.

Demographics 

Mother tongue (2016):
 English as first language: 87.2%
 French as first language: 10.6%
 Other as first language: none

Local government

List of former mayors:

 Gérald Manwell (2001–2009)
 Lynne Cameron (2009–present)

See also
 List of village municipalities in Quebec

References

External links

 Elections Canada Results - 39th General Election (2006)
 Director General of Quebec Elections
 Official Transport Quebec Road Map

Incorporated places in Outaouais
Portages in Canada
Villages in Quebec